Arosemena is a surname. Notable people with the surname include:

Alcibíades Arosemena (1883–1958), Panamanian politician
Carlos Julio Arosemena Monroy (1919–2004), President of Ecuador from November 7, 1961 to July 11, 1963
Carlos Julio Arosemena Tola (1888–1952), President of Ecuador from September 15, 1947 to September 1, 1948
Domingo Díaz Arosemena (1875–1949), Panamanian politician
Emita Arosemena (born 1931), winner of the Miss Panamá 1953 title
Esmeralda Arosemena de Troitiño (born 1944), judge from Panama and president of the Inter-American Commission on Human Rights
Florencio Harmodio Arosemena (1872–1945), President of Panama from October 1, 1928 to January 3, 1931
Juan Demóstenes Arosemena (1879–1939), President of Panama from October 1, 1936 to December 16, 1939
Justo Arosemena (1817–1896), statesman, writer, lawyer, and politician from Panama
Justo Arosemena Lacayo (1929–2000), Colombian sculptor born in Panama
Otto Arosemena (1925–1984), President of Ecuador from November 16, 1966 to September 1, 1968
Pablo Arosemena (1836–1920), First Vice President of Panama from October 5, 1910 to October 1, 1912
Reggie Arosemena (born 1986), football Midfielder
Rubén Arosemena (born 1961), the Second Vice President of Panama from 2004 to 2009

See also
Carlos Julio Arosemena Tola Canton, canton of Ecuador, located in the Napo Province
Carlos Julio Arosemena Tola, Ecuador, location in the Napo Province, Ecuador
Arosen